Kataragama Peak is a mountain near Kataragama, in the Monaragala District of Sri Lanka.

See also 
 List of mountains of Sri Lanka

References 

Mountains of Sri Lanka
Landforms of Monaragala District